The Churches Conservation Trust, which was initially known as the Redundant Churches Fund, is a charity whose purpose is to protect certain historic churches at risk, namely those that have been made redundant by the Church of England. The Trust was established by the Pastoral Measure of 1968. The legally defined object of the Trust is "the preservation, in the interests of the nation and the Church of England, of churches and parts of churches of historic and archaeological interest or architectural quality vested in the Fund ... together with their contents so vested".  The charity cares for over 350 churches.  The Trust is financed partly by the Department for Culture, Media and Sport and the Church Commissioners, but mostly from other sources, including the general public. The charity is run by a board of trustees, who delegate the day-to-day management to a chief executive and his senior management team.

The Trust's primary aim is to ensure that the buildings in its care are weatherproof and to prevent any deterioration in their condition.  The majority of the churches remain consecrated, and many are occasionally still used for worship.  Local communities are encouraged to use them for appropriate activities and events, and the buildings provide an educational resource, allowing children and young people to study history and architecture. Nearly 2 million people visit the Trust's churches each year.  As most of the churches remain consecrated, they are used for occasional services where this is practical, and some are venues for concerts and other purposes.

This list contains the 62 churches cared for by the Churches Conservation Trust in South West England, covering the counties of Bristol, Wiltshire, Somerset, Dorset, Devon and Cornwall. The majority are village churches, and in the case of St Giles' church in Imber, Wiltshire, in a village from which the entire civilian population was evicted in 1943 to provide an exercise area for American troops preparing for the invasion of Europe during the Second World War. Non-military access to the church has been limited to several open days a year since then. Some of the churches are in major centres of population, such as St Martin's Church in Exeter and the Church of St John the Baptist in Bristol. Many of the churches are built on the sites of earlier places of worship, but the oldest building in the list is the Old Church of St Nicholas at Uphill, Somerset, which is largely roofless but is still occasionally used for services. The most recent is St Mary's Church in South Tidworth, Wiltshire, which was built in 1878. Some of the buildings, such as St Mary's Church in Wilton, Wiltshire, are partially ruined, but many have impressive interiors, often dating back several hundred years. St John the Baptist Church in Inglesham, Wiltshire, has wall paintings and other churches have highly decorated pulpits or reredos. Many still host Anglican services, but others are used by different denominations or have been converted for secular use. St Thomas à Becket Church in Pensford, Somerset, has been converted into a private house, although the tower remains in the care of the trust. St Paul's Church in Bristol is now used as a performance space and circus skills school, Circomedia, but remains consecrated.

Key

Churches

See also

List of churches preserved by the Churches Conservation Trust in the East of England
List of churches preserved by the Churches Conservation Trust in the English Midlands
List of churches preserved by the Churches Conservation Trust in Northern England
List of churches preserved by the Churches Conservation Trust in Southeast England

Notes

The dates given for construction are often not exactly known. Where this is the case the century of first construction of the existing building is given.

References

Churches Conservation Trust in Southwest England

Churches Conservation Trust in Southwest England